Lloyd E. "Holly" Hollingsworth (October 23, 1911 – August 9, 2004) was an American football, basketball, baseball, ice hockey, tennis, and gymnastics coach. He served three stints as the head football coach at Gustavus Adolphus College in St. Peter, Minnesota, in 1942, from 1946 to 1950, and from 1952 to 1960, compiling a record of 94–33–5.  His tenure was interrupted by service in the United States Navy during World War II and the United States Army during the Korean War.

Hollingsworth attended Roosevelt High School in Minneapolis, Minnesota.  He moved on to Gustavus Adolphus, where he earned 11 varsity letters in football, baseball, and gymnastics.  After graduating in 1936, he coached as high schools in Clinton, Madison, and Waseca, Minnesota.  He returned to Gustavus Adolphus in 1942 as athletic director and head coach in football, basketball, and baseball.  Hollingsworth resigned as athletic director at  Gustavus Adolphus in 1974 and retired from his post of chairman of the school's Department of Health and Physical Education in 1978.

Hollingsworth earned a master's degree from the University of Minnesota and a doctorate in education from New York University (NYU) in 1958.  He died on August 9, 2004.

Head coaching record

Football

References

External links
 

1911 births
2004 deaths
American gymnasts
Gustavus Adolphus College faculty
Gustavus Adolphus Golden Gusties athletic directors
Gustavus Adolphus Golden Gusties baseball coaches
Gustavus Adolphus Golden Gusties baseball players
Gustavus Adolphus Golden Gusties football coaches
Gustavus Adolphus Golden Gusties football players
Gustavus Adolphus Golden Gusties men's basketball coaches
Gustavus Adolphus Golden Gusties men's ice hockey coaches
College men's gymnasts in the United States
College gymnastics coaches in the United States
College tennis coaches in the United States
High school football coaches in Minnesota
United States Army personnel of the Korean War
United States Navy personnel of World War II
University of Minnesota alumni
New York University alumni
Sports coaches from Minneapolis
Players of American football from Minneapolis
Baseball players from Minneapolis
Basketball coaches from Minnesota
Roosevelt High School (Minnesota) alumni